Pierre David Oriola Garriga (alternate spelling: Pere Oriola; born 25 September 1992) is a Spanish professional basketball player for AEK Athens of the Greek Basket League and the Basketball Champions League. He can play at both the power forward and center positions.

Professional career
Oriola started playing basketball in his hometown team, Club Natació Tàrrega. In 2009 he began his pro career with the Spanish First Division senior team of Manresa. He then played on loan in the Spanish amateur level Liga EBA, with CE Saint Nicolau, during the 2010–11 season. He then joined the Spanish 2nd Division club, Força Lleida, for the 2012–13 season.

He then moved to the Spanish 2nd Division club, Peñas Huesca, for the 2013–14 season. His next team was the first division Spanish club CB Sevilla. With Sevilla, he played in the 2nd-tier level European-wide league, the EuroCup, for the first time during the 2014–15 season.

He then moved to the first division Spanish club Valencia Basket. With Valencia, he won the Spanish League 2016–17 season championship.

On July 14, 2017, FC Barcelona Lassa paid a €1,000,000 contract buyout amount to Valencia Basket, in order to secure Oriola's player rights. Oriola subsequently signed a four-year deal with Barcelona. On July 7, 2020, Oriola renewed his contract with the club through 2024.

On October 15, 2022, he signed with Bàsquet Girona of Liga ACB.

On February 18, 2023, he signed a contract with AEK Athens of the Greek Basket League.

Spain national team
Oriola was a member of the Spain junior national teams. With Spain's junior national teams, he played at the 2010 FIBA Europe Under-18 Championship, and at the 2012 FIBA Europe Under-20 Championship, where he won a bronze medal.

He has also been a member of the senior Spain national team. With Spain's senior team he played at the EuroBasket 2017.

References

External links
ACB.com Profile 
EuroLeague.net Profile
FIBA Profile (archive)
FIBA Profile (game center)
FIBA Europe Profile
Eurobasket.com Profile
Twitter 

1992 births
Living people
2019 FIBA Basketball World Cup players
AEK B.C. players
Bàsquet Girona players
Bàsquet Manresa players
Basketball players from Catalonia
CB Peñas Huesca players
Centers (basketball)
FC Barcelona Bàsquet players
FIBA Basketball World Cup-winning players
Força Lleida CE players
Liga ACB players
People from Tàrrega
Power forwards (basketball)
Real Betis Baloncesto players
Spanish men's basketball players
Sportspeople from the Province of Lleida
Valencia Basket players